İsmail Süleyman Oktay  (born 9 January 1959) is a Turkish former international footballer and manager.

Career
Oktay played his entire career at Beşiktaş J.K.. He was promoted to senior team in 1978, along with then-youth fellows Ziya Doğan and Fuat Yaman.

He represented Turkey at senior level one time on 7 October 1981, against Soviet Union in which Turkey was defeated 3–0 at 1982 FIFA World Cup qualification phase.

Achievements
 Süper Lig (1): 1981–82
 Prime Minister's Cup (1): 1977
 TSYD Cup (1): 1984

References

External links
Profile at Turkish Football Federation

1959 births
Association football defenders
Turkish footballers
Turkey international footballers
Süper Lig players
Beşiktaş J.K. footballers
Living people